Affirmative Insurance Holdings, Inc. is an American company that provides individual consumers non-standard personal automobile insurance policies and other related products through its subsidiaries, independent agents and unaffiliated underwriting agencies in the United States. The company offers liability-only policies including bodily injury liability coverage, property damage liability coverage, personal injury protection coverage and medical payment coverage. It also offers full coverage policies including collision coverage, comprehensive coverage and so on.

History
In 1998, the company founded in Addison, Texas as Instant Insurance Holdings, Inc.

In 2003, the company completed the acquisition of two non-standard automobile insurance companies from Vesta Insurance Group, Inc.

In 2004, the company completed the initial public offering.

In 2007, the company completed the acquisition of USAgencies, a provider of non-standard automobile insurance.

In 2013, Confie Seguros, a rapidly growing national provider of personal lines insurance signed an agreement to acquire the retail distribution arm of Affirmative Insurance Holdings, Inc.

In 2015, the company filed for chapter 11 bankruptcy.

In 2018 the liquidation was discharged.

References

External links

Companies based in Texas
Insurance companies of the United States
Financial services companies established in 1998
1998 establishments in Texas
Insurance companies based in Texas